is the 17th single by Japanese idol girl group SKE48. It was released on March 31, 2015. This single and NMB48's Don't Look Back! were released on the same day, and SKE48 placed 1st in Oricon's Daily Charts on its first day with 573,074 copies sold.

Background 
This single was released in 9 versions: Type A (Limited/Regular), Type B (Limited/Regular), Type C (Limited/Regular), Type D (Limited/Regular) and Theater Edition. The title song was first performed on Music Station on February 20, 2015. Full song and music video wasn't leaked on social networks prior to single release.

Track listing

TYPE-A

TYPE-B

TYPE-C

TYPE-D

Theater Edition

Members

Coquettish Jūtai Chū 
Team S: Rion Azuma, Masana Oya, Ryoha Kitagawa, Haruka Futamura, Jurina Matsui, Ami Miyamae, Sae Miyazawa
Team KII: Yuna Ego, Mina Oba, Saki Goudo, Akane Takayanagi, Nao Furuhata, Sarina Souda
Team E: Kyoka Isohara, Kanon Kimoto, Marika Tani, Sumire Sato, Aya Shibata, Akari Suda, Rena Matsui
Kenkyuusei: Kaori Matsumura

DIRTY 
Team S: Rion Azuma, Asana Inuzuka, Masana Oya, Ryoha Kitagawa, Risako Goto, Mieko Sato, Mai Takeuchi, Natsumi Tanaka, Rika Tsuzuki, Yuka Nakanishi, Yume Noguchi, Haruka Futamura, Jurina Matsui, Chikako Matsumoto, Sae Miyazawa, Ami Miyamae, Miki Yakata, Suzuran Yamauchi

Boku wa Shitteiru 
Team S: Masana Oya, Ryoha Kitagawa, Risako Goto, Mieko Sato, Yuka Nakanishi, Haruka Futamura, Jurina Matsui, Sae Miyazawa, Ami Miyamae, Miki Yakata
Team KII: Riho Abiru, Anna Ishida, Mikoto Uchiyama, Yuna Ego, Akane Takayanagi, Airi Furukawa, Nao Furuhata
Team E: Kyoka Isohara, Madoka Umemoto, Rumi Kato, Kanon Kimoto, Ami Kobayashi, Makiko Saito, Aya Shibata, Akari Suda, Rena Matsui
Kenkyuusei: Kaori Matsumura

Konya wa Join Us! 
Team KII: Riho Abiru, Yuki Arai, Anna Ishida, Mikoto Uchiyama, Yuna Ego, Mina Oba, Ruka Kitano, Saki Goudo, Sarina Souda, Yumana Takagi, Natsuki Takatsuka, Akane Takayanagi, Yuzuki Hidaka, Airi Furukawa, Nao Furuhata, Yukari Yamashita

Oto wo Keshita Terebi 
Team E: Kyoka Isohara, Narumi Ichino, Madoka Umemoto, Rumi Kato, Kanon Kimoto, Haruka Kumazaki, Kumiko Koishi, Ami Kobayashi, Makiko Saito, Mei Sakai, Sumire Sato, Aya Shibata, Akari Suda, Sana Takatera, Marika Tani, Nao Fukushi, Rena Matsui

Sakura, Oboete Itekure 
Team S: Mieko Sato, Yuka Nakanishi
Team KII: Airi Furukawa

Yoru no Kyoukasho 
Team S: Rion Azuma, Ryoha Kitagawa, Haruka Futamura, Ami Miyamae, Miki Yakata, Suzuran Yamauchi
Team KII: Mina Oba, Saki Goudo, Akane Takayanagi, Yuzuki Hidaka, Nao Furuhata
Team E: Madoka Umemoto, Rumi Kato, Haruka Kumazaki, Mei Sakai, Sumire Sato
Kenkyuusei: Juna Yamada

References 

2015 singles
2015 songs
Avex Trax singles
Japanese-language songs
SKE48 songs
Oricon Weekly number-one singles